Marta Grandi (3 July 1915, Bologna – Bologna, 6 October 2005, Bologna ) was an Italian entomologist who specialised in Ephemeroptera.

Publications

Ephemeroidea. Fauna d'Italia 3:1-472 (1960).

See Bibliography of Ephemeroptera

External links
 In memoria di Marta Grandi

Italian entomologists
Women entomologists
1915 births
2005 deaths
20th-century Italian zoologists